The Swedish Biathlon Federation is a special sports association for biathlon in Sweden. It was established in 1986. In November 1987 it was appointed into the Swedish Sports Confederation  from 1 July 1988. Its headquarters are in Östersund.

References

External links
Official website 

1986 establishments in Sweden
Sports organizations established in 1986
Biathlon in Sweden
Biathlon organizations
Biathlon
Sport in Östersund